Royal Standard de Liège, commonly referred to as Standard Liège or simply Standard in Belgium, is a Belgian professional football club based in the city of Liège.

They are one of the most successful clubs in Belgium, having won the Belgian league on ten occasions, most recently in 2007–08 and 2008–09. They have been in the top flight without interruption since 1921, longer than any other Belgian side. They have also won eight Belgian Cups, and in 1981–82 they reached the final of the European Cup Winners' Cup, which they lost 2–1 against Barcelona.

Standard players are nicknamed les Rouches  because of their red jerseys. The French word for red, rouge, when pronounced with a Liège accent, sounds like rouche.

In March 2022, Standard Liège was acquired by US-based private investment firm 777 Partners.

History

On the first day of school in September 1898, the pupils of Collège Saint-Servais in Liège started a football club, which they called Standard of Liège in reference to Standard Athletic Club of Paris. Standard, whose official name is Royal Standard Club of Liège, was based in Cointe and Grivegnée before settling permanently in 1909 in Sclessin, an industrial neighbourhood in Liège. Standard initially joined the Belgian First League in 1909 before returning to the lower leagues a few years later. The club then gained promotion back to the top division in 1921 and has never been relegated since.

Shortly after World War II, Roger Petit, a former player and team captain, became general secretary of the club. Petit worked alongside President Henrard Paul to establish Standard among the elite of Belgian football. In 1954, Standard won their first club trophy, the Belgian Cup, which was soon followed by a first national title in 1957–58.

At European level, in the 1960s, the club reached the semi-finals of the European Cup in 1961–62, falling to beaten finalists Real Madrid 0–6 on aggregate, and the same stage of the Cup Winners' Cup in the year 1966–67, losing to eventual champions Bayern Munich. The 1960s and early 1970s brought much success to the club, as Standard won six Belgian First Division titles, two Belgian Cups and a League Cup.

Driven by the Austrian Ernst Happel, Standard won the Belgian Cup again in 1981. The following year, Raymond Goethals took control of the team. Playing by the "Raymond Science" philosophy of football, the club was twice the champions of Belgium, twice winners of the Belgian Supercup (in three appearances) and reached the final of the European Cup Winners' Cup in 1982. Standard played against Barcelona in the final at the Camp Nou on 12 May 1982, losing the match 1–2 to the Spaniards.

Just days before the match against Barcelona, to secure the championship of Belgium and guard against last minute injuries. Standard had approached Roland Janssen, the captain of Thor Waterschei, to ensure that Thor players threw the final game of the season. This scandal involved several players, including Eric Gerets, and coach Raymond Goethals, who fled to Portugal to escape suspension. In compensation the Standard players gave their game bonuses to the Waterschei players. Following the scandal, Standard was deprived of many of its playing staff due to long-term suspensions and it took the club several years to recover from the incident.

On 6 June 1993, Standard won the Belgian Cup for the fifth time in its history, defeating Robert Waseige's Charleroi at the Constant Vanden Stock Stadium in Brussels. This led to another appearance in the UEFA Cup Winners' Cup, ending in a record 10–0 aggregate defeat to Arsenal— having lost 3–0 at Highbury in London, Standard were humiliated 0–7 in the second leg at home.

Following the scandal of 1982, it took 25 years before Standard won the Belgium Championship again, lifting the title on 20 April 2008. The club won the Belgian league again the following year, securing the club's tenth league title on 24 May 2009 after a home-and-away game against rivals Anderlecht. Standard won the national cup once more in 2011, defeating Westerlo 2–0 in the final at the King Baudouin Stadium on 21 May 2011. The club was bought by businessman Roland Duchatelet on 23 June 2011, who then took over English club Charlton in December 2013, creating an affiliation between the two clubs.

On 20 October 2014, Guy Luzon resigned as manager of Standard with the club sitting in 12th position in the Pro League standings and having taken only two points from three UEFA Europa League matches. Luzon later became head coach of Charlton. Assistant and former midfielder Ivan Vukomanović took over as caretaker-manager.

Golden Shoe
On nine occasions, Standard players have won the Belgian Golden Shoe as the best player in the domestic league. Jean Nicolay won the award in 1963, Wilfried Van Moer in 1969 and 1970, Christian Piot in 1972, Eric Gerets in 1982, Sérgio Conceição in 2005, Steven Defour in 2007, Axel Witsel in 2008 and Milan Jovanović in 2009.

Rivalries 
Standard Liège supporters share a fierce rivalry with RSC Anderlecht, dubbed the Belgian "Clasico". The rivalry not only reflects the traditional geographical one between the two cities of Liège and Brussels, but also a class divide, with Anderlecht being perceived as the team of the bourgeois elite and Standard, based in an industrial district, as the workers club. The two teams were also the two most successful teams in Belgium for long periods until the emergence of Club Brugge. Many players have played for both clubs, most notably Standard title winning captain Steven Defour, who when returning to Sclessin under Anderlecht's purple colours was greeted with a large tifo with his head decapitated.

Standard also has a traditional city derbies with RFC Seraing and RFC Liège. In recent years, they have also developed a rivalry with fellow Walloon club Sporting Charleroi, with several matches having been stopped due to crowd disturbances between the two sets of supporters.

Matches with Limburgish clubs Racing Genk and STVV also are characterised with heightened tensions. This is due to the proximity of Genk and Sint-Truiden with the city of Liège and the historical ties of the mining and steel industries of these regions in Belgium. The rivalry between Standard and Racing Genk was fueled by the events of May 17, 2011. In this title match Standard winger Mehdi Carcela was hit in the face with a tackle by Genk defender Chris Mavinga. Carcela lost consciousness and was subbed off. Mavinga was not sent off after his reckless intervention. Genk went on to win the title with 1-1 draw, but it left many Standard fans with a sour taste.

Honours

Domestic

Belgian League
Champions (10): 1957–58, 1960–61, 1962–63, 1968–69, 1969–70, 1970–71, 1981–82, 1982–83, 2007–08, 2008–09
Runners-up (13): 1925–26, 1927–28, 1935–36, 1961–62, 1964–65, 1972–73, 1979–80, 1992–93, 1994–95, 2005–06, 2010–11, 2013–14, 2017–18

Belgian Cup
Champions (8): 1953–54, 1965–66, 1966–67, 1980–81, 1992–93, 2010–11, 2015–16, 2017–18
Runners-up (10): 1964–65, 1971–72, 1972–73, 1983–84, 1987–88, 1988–89, 1998–99, 1999–00, 2006–07, 2020–21

Belgian League Cup
Champions (1): 1975

Belgian Supercup
Champions (4): 1981, 1983, 2008, 2009
Runners-up (5): 1982, 1993, 2011, 2016, 2018

International
UEFA Cup Winners' Cup
Runners-up (1): 1981–82

UEFA Intertoto Cup
Runners-up (1): 1996

Other
Amsterdam Tournament:
Runners-up (1): 1981

European record

A = appearances, GP = games played, W = won, D = drawn, L = lost, GF = goals for, GA = goals against.

Summary of best results
From the quarter-finals upwards:

European Cup/UEFA Champions League:
semi-finalists in 1962
quarter-finalists in 1959, 1970 and 1972

UEFA Cup Winners' Cup (1):
runners-up in 1982
semi-finalists in 1967
quarter-finalists in 1968

UEFA Cup/UEFA Europa League:
quarter-finalists in 1981 and 2010

UEFA Intertoto Cup (1):
runners-up in 1996
semi-finalists in 2000

Players

Current squad

SL16 FC
SL16 FC is the reserve squad of Standard that plays in the second-tier Challenger Pro League.

Out on loan

Notable players

Most appearances

Most goals

Captains
Player's name in bold when Standard won the title

Club officials

Coaches

Cultural references
Standard Liège are mentioned in the song "This One's for Now" by the band Half Man Half Biscuit on the album Urge for Offal.

References

External links

  
 Standard Liège at UEFA.COM 
 Standard Liège at National Football Teams.com

 
Association football clubs established in 1898
Football clubs in Belgium
1898 establishments in Belgium
Organisations based in Belgium with royal patronage
Sport in Liège
Belgian Pro League clubs
2022 mergers and acquisitions